Jonathan Aguilar Garcia (June 25, 1970 – March 9, 2019), better known by his stage name Chokoleit, was a Filipino comedian, actor, and TV host. He was best known for his role as Pearly Shell in the Philippine television series Marina.

Education
Chokoleit attended Ateneo de Davao University where he received his Bachelor of Arts in Mass Communication.

Career

Chokoleit's showbiz career started in 1994 when he was discovered by movie director/ talent manager Maryo J. de los Reyes. His contemporary was fellow stand-up comedian Gil "Ate Gay" Morales. Not soon after, he became a bit player in the GMA Network sitcom Haybol Rambol, sharing screen time with lead stars Dennis Padilla, Benjie Paras and Nida Blanca. He managed to stay with the sitcom until it was cancelled in 1995. He also became part of the talk show Brunch as comic relief to main hosts Bing Loyzaga and Michelle van Eimeren from 1998-1999 and started to appear in movies also as a bit player, while continuing his work as a stand-up comedian in The Library, Punchline and Laffline.

In 2004, Chokoleit bagged the role of Pearly Shell in the ABS-CBN fantaserye Marina after being recommended by director Wenn Deramas, who became instrumental to his career until the director's untimely death in 2016. From Marina, more TV shows and movies came for Chokoleit. His life story was essayed in the drama anthology Maalaala Mo Kaya and became a talent of the Kapamilya Network's "Star Magic".

Death
Chokoleit died of a heart attack on the evening of March 9, 2019 at the age of 48, shortly after a performance at the Kawayan Festival in Bangued, Abra province. Before his death, he experienced difficulty breathing after his performance and was rushed to a local hospital. His remains were brought to Davao City for the funeral. He was cremated afterwards on March 17. His ashes were interred in Davao Memorial Park.

Filmography

Television

Film

References

External links
 

1970 births
2019 deaths
Filipino male comedians
Filipino male film actors
Filipino male television actors
Filipino television personalities
Filipino gay actors
Gay comedians
People from Antipolo
People from Davao City
People from Rizal
Star Magic
Visayan people
21st-century Filipino male actors
21st-century Filipino LGBT people